Hunter Scott Thomas Laurie Hendry (24 May 1895 – 16 December 1988) was a cricketer who played for New South Wales, Victoria and Australia.

Nicknamed "Stork", Hendry was a formidable batsman to whom bowlers found difficulty in delivering. He played in 11 Tests and 140 first-class matches between 1918–19 and 1935–36.

At the time of his death, aged 93, he was the oldest surviving Test and Sheffield Shield cricketer.

See also
 List of Victoria first-class cricketers
 List of New South Wales representative cricketers

References

External links

1895 births
1988 deaths
Australia Test cricketers
New South Wales cricketers
Victoria cricketers
Melbourne Cricket Club cricketers
People educated at Sydney Grammar School
Australian cricketers
Cricketers from Sydney